Jegertroppen is an all female special operations forces unit of the Special Operations Commando (FSK) of the Norwegian Special Operation Forces (NORSOF). 

Jeger Troop has special reconnaissance (SR) in and around built-up areas as the main focus. The troop was initially created as a one-year pilot program in 2014 by FSK that was later extended for another three years and in 2017 was declared a success. It is reported to be the world's first all-female special forces unit.

Background
The Norwegian Armed Forces has conscription for all males who are liable for compulsory military service from the year they turn 19 years of age, until the end of the year in which they reach the age of 44 which was originally introduced in 1897. Following the Second World War, women were allowed to serve as voluntary reservists in 1959, in 1976 this changed to allow entry to regular service in non-combat roles and in 1984 all combat positions became open to women. From 2009, all women were obligated to meet the conscription board, the same as males, however military service remained voluntary. In January 2015, the law changed to extend conscription to women, making Norway the first NATO member and first European country to make military service compulsory for both sexes. The Norwegian Armed Forces have a stated objective of increasing female membership to 20 per cent by 2020. 

During the War in Afghanistan, FSK commanders saw an operational need for female operators who would be able to communicate directly with women to gather intelligence and build community relations as male operators were forbidden from speaking to women due to religious and cultural constraints. The FSK had been tasked with mentoring the  Afghan Ministry of Interior Affairs  Crisis Response Unit (CRU-222) based in Kabul and required female advisers for the CRU and also for arrests to take care of women and children. Women had been eligible for entry into Norwegian Special Operation Forces, against the same male selection criteria, with several making it through the admission process but none had completed the selection phase being unable to compete with the physical strength of the males.

History
In March 2013, planning for the unit began under the code name "Tundra", spearheaded by the former and current heads of the FSK, Eirik Kristoffersen and his younger brother Frode Arnfinn Kristoffersen, and the first class began training in June 2014. In 2014, out of 317 applicants for Jeger Troop’s founding selection program only 88 passed the selection course with 20 completing the 10 month training program and 13 going on to form the unit in 2015. In 2015, there were 196 applicants, with 37 making it through the selection, 17 completed the training and 14 joined the unit. The majority of applicants have a strong sporting background. 

Hunter Troop was the subject of a 2016 NRK documentary Jenter for Norge for which a camera crew followed trainees for almost the full year of their training. No Jeger Troop operator has deployed operationally.

Selection and training
Candidates are selected based on attitude and physical fitness, the minimum physical standards are: one pull-up; 20 push-ups; 35 sit-ups in two minutes or less; 20 back extensions; swim , with no underwater phobia; and perform a  road run carrying  in 59 minutes. In addition there are required tests in  medicine ball throw, standing long jump, and 3000-meter run which will not disqualify, but do count towards selection. There is a 3 week pre-selection course learning basic skills before commencing the week long selection course named "hell week" that is a test of mental and physical strength involving long marches over several days with little time for rest, and minimum amounts of food and water.

Applicants then face a 10 month training program that includes a patrol course, survival course, shooting course, communications course, medical course, parachute course, winter training, winter exercise, close combat course, close quarter battle (CQB) course, vehicle course and urban special reconnaissance course culminating in a final exercise. To complete the program, candidates must be able to march 15 km (9 miles) in full gear ( backpack, weapon, boots) through forests within two hours and 15 minutes or less; perform 50 sit-ups in two minutes, six pull-ups and 40 push-ups; run  in 13 minutes or less; and swim  in 11 minutes or less, the first 25 metres underwater. In the first year, trainees recreated the World War II sinking of SF Hydro during Operation Gunnerside. The unit trains at Rena leir army camp in Rena.

References

External links
 Official website 
 

Women in the Norwegian military
Special forces of Norway
2014 establishments in Norway
Military units and formations established in 2014
All-female military units and formations